Moysés Blás (alternate spelling: Moses Blass) (born March 24, 1937) is a Brazilian former basketball player.

Blass is Jewish, and was born in Minas Gerais, Brazil.  He is 5' 11".  He played basketball for Brazil in the 1960 Olympics in Rome, and won a bronze medal, as Brazil finished behind the United States and the Soviet Union.

See also
List of select Jewish basketball players

References

External links
 

1937 births
Olympic basketball players of Brazil
Basketball players at the 1960 Summer Olympics
Olympic bronze medalists for Brazil
Olympic medalists in basketball
Sportspeople from Minas Gerais
Jewish men's basketball players
Brazilian Jews
Living people
Medalists at the 1960 Summer Olympics
Brazilian men's basketball players